Fox Soccer Report was Fox Soccer's flagship studio program.  The show was produced by Fox Sports World Canada, a Canadian international sports network owned by Shaw Media (parent of Global Television Network), from CKND-TV's studios in Winnipeg, Manitoba. The show, formerly called Fox Sports World Report and Global SportsLink, aired nightly on Fox Soccer in the United States and EuroWorld Sport (Canada) at 10 p.m. Eastern Time (or after a live prime-time match), with numerous re-airs, usually at 1 a.m. Eastern. The show also aired on Fox Soccer Plus nightly at 11 p.m. Eastern Time.

With the shutdown of Fox Sports World in April 2012, Fox Soccer Report continued to be produced until August 16, 2012, when it was replaced by Fox Soccer News, a new soccer news program produced by Sportsnet out of Toronto, the following day.

Anchors
The program featured multiple sportscasters that alternated on different days of the week. Its final lineup was anchored by Michelle Lissel, Eoin O'Callaghan and Asa Rehman. Former Scottish amateur soccer player Bobby McMahon was featured on Mondays and Fridays, providing analysis of the weekend's matches.

Former anchors
Mitch Peacock
Carlos Machado
Nabil Karim
Terri Leigh
Lara Baldesarra
Jeremy St. Louis
Derek Taylor
Julie Stewart-Binks

External links
Official Site

References

Fox Sports original programming
Association football television series
2000s Canadian sports television series
2010s Canadian sports television series
Soccer on United States television
Soccer on Canadian television
Fox Soccer original programming
Television shows filmed in Winnipeg